The 1986 Boston Red Sox season was the 86th season in the franchise's Major League Baseball history. The Red Sox finished first in the American League East with a record of 95 wins and 66 losses. After defeating the California Angels in the ALCS, the Red Sox lost the World Series to the New York Mets in seven games.

Offseason

November 13, 1985: Bob Ojeda, Tom McCarthy, John Mitchell and Chris Bayer (minors) were traded to the New York Mets for Calvin Schiraldi, Wes Gardner, John Christensen, and La Schelle Tarver.
December 11, 1985: Mark Clear was traded to the Milwaukee Brewers for Ed Romero.
 January 14, 1986: Alan Mills was selected in the first round (13th overall) of the amateur draft, but did not sign.
 January 14, 1986: Curt Schilling was selected in the second round of the amateur draft, and signed on May 30.
 March 28, 1986: Mike Easler was traded to the New York Yankees for Don Baylor.

Spring training
The Red Sox held spring training at Chain of Lakes Park in Winter Haven, Florida, for the 21st season.

Regular season

The Red Sox played only 161 games, as a road game scheduled against the Milwaukee Brewers on September 24 was rained out, and was not rescheduled as it had no bearing on the divisional race.

Highlights 

 On April 29 at Fenway Park, 23-year-old Roger Clemens struck out 20 Seattle Mariners to set a major league record for a nine-inning game.

 Clemens finished the regular season with 24 wins, the most by a Red Sox pitcher since Mel Parnell won 25 games in 1949.

Season standings

This was the first season since 1904 that the Yankees franchise (then known as the Highlanders) finished second in the standings to the Red Sox franchise (then known as the Americans).

Record vs. opponents

Notable transactions
 June 2, 1986: The Red Sox selected Scott Cooper in the third round of the 1986 Major League Baseball draft.
 June 29, 1986: Steve Lyons was traded by the Red Sox to the Chicago White Sox for Tom Seaver.
 August 17, 1986: The Seattle Mariners traded Spike Owen and Dave Henderson to the Red Sox for Rey Quiñones and players to be named later (Mike Brown, Mike Trujillo, and John Christensen).

Opening day lineup

Source:

Alumni game
On May 17, the Red Sox held an old-timers game at Fenway, before a scheduled game with the Texas Rangers. The game—themed to commemorate the 40th anniversary of the pennant-winning 1946 Red Sox—welcomed back 19 alumni of the team and was also the first to invite non-Red Sox alumni. Besides Ted Williams, Luis Tiant, and Rico Petrocelli, the day featured appearances by all three DiMaggio brothers: Joe, Vince, and Dom. The umpiring crew included Hall of Fame inductee Jocko Conlan.

Illegal Firing of Tommy Harper
General Manager Haywood Sullivan, a supporter of the all-white and anti-Black Elks Club of Winter Haven, Florida (where the team then held spring training), would welcome the organization into the Red Sox' Chain of Lakes Park clubhouse to invite the white players and white front-office personnel only to the Elks' segregated facilities. Former outfielder and coach Tommy Harper spoke against this practice in 1985 and the Red Sox retaliated and fired Harper. On July 1, 1986, the Equal Employment Opportunity Commission vindicated Harper and cited the Red Sox for illegal actions.

Roster

Game log

|-  style="text-align:center;
| 1 || April 7 || @ Tigers
|-  style="text-align:center;
| 2 || April 9 || @ Tigers
|-  style="text-align:center;
| 3 || April 10 || @ Tigers
|-  style="text-align:center;
| 4 || April 11 || @ White Sox
|-  style="text-align:center;
| 5 || April 12 || @ White Sox
|-  style="text-align:center;
| 6 || April 13 || @ White Sox
|-  style="text-align:center;
| 7 || April 14 || Royals
|-  style="text-align:center;
| 8 || April 16 || Royals
|-  style="text-align:center;
| 9 || April 17 || Royals
|-  style="text-align:center;
| 10 || April 18 || White Sox
|-  style="text-align:center;
| 11 || April 19 || White Sox
|-  style="text-align:center;
| 12 || April 20 || White Sox
|-  style="text-align:center;
| 13 || April 21 || Tigers
|-  style="text-align:center;
| 14 || April 22 || Tigers
|-  style="text-align:center;
| 15 || April 23 || Tigers
|-  style="text-align:center;
| 16 || April 25 || @ Royals
|-  style="text-align:center;
| 17 || April 26 || @ Royals
|-  style="text-align:center;
| 18 || April 29 || Mariners
|-  style="text-align:center;
| 19 || April 30 || Mariners
|-

|-  style="text-align:center;
| 20 || May 1 || Mariners
|-  style="text-align:center;
| 21 || May 2 || Athletics
|-  style="text-align:center;
| 22 || May 3 || Athletics
|-  style="text-align:center;
| 23 || May 4 || Athletics
|-  style="text-align:center;
| 24 || May 5 || Angels
|-  style="text-align:center;
| 25 || May 6 || Angels
|-  style="text-align:center;
| 26 || May 7 || @ Mariners
|-  style="text-align:center;
| 27 || May 8 || @ Mariners
|-  style="text-align:center;
| 28 || May 9 || @ Athletics
|-  style="text-align:center;
| 29 || May 10 || @ Athletics
|-  style="text-align:center;
| 30 || May 11 || @ Athletics
|-  style="text-align:center;
| 31 || May 12 || @ Angels
|-  style="text-align:center;
| 32 || May 13 || @ Angels
|-  style="text-align:center;
| 33 || May 14 || @ Angels
|-  style="text-align:center;
| 34 || May 16 || Rangers
|-  style="text-align:center;
| 35 || May 17 || Rangers
|-  style="text-align:center;
| 36 || May 18 || Rangers
|-  style="text-align:center;
| 37 || May 19 || Twins
|-  style="text-align:center;
| 38 || May 20 || Twins
|-  style="text-align:center;
| 39 || May 21 || Twins
|-  style="text-align:center;
| 40 || May 23 || @ Rangers
|-  style="text-align:center;
| 41 || May 24 || @ Rangers
|-  style="text-align:center;
| 42 || May 25 || @ Rangers
|-  style="text-align:center;
| 43 || May 26 || @ Indians
|-  style="text-align:center;
| 44 || May 27 || @ Indians
|-  style="text-align:center;
| 45 || May 28 || @ Indians
|-  style="text-align:center;
| 46 || May 30 || @ Twins
|-  style="text-align:center;
| 47 || May 31 || @ Twins
|-

|-  style="text-align:center;
| 48 || June 1 || @ Twins
|-  style="text-align:center;
| 49 || June 2 || Indians
|-  style="text-align:center;
| 50 || June 3 || Indians
|-  style="text-align:center;
| 51 || June 4 || Indians
|-  style="text-align:center;
| 52 || June 5 || @ Brewers
|-  style="text-align:center;
| 53 || June 6 || @ Brewers
|-  style="text-align:center;
| 54 || June 7 || @ Brewers
|-  style="text-align:center;
| 55 || June 8 || @ Brewers
|-  style="text-align:center;
| 56 || June 9 || @ Blue Jays
|-  style="text-align:center;
| 57 || June 10 || @ Blue Jays
|-  style="text-align:center;
| 58 || June 11 || @ Blue Jays
|-  style="text-align:center;
| 59 || June 13 || Brewers
|-  style="text-align:center;
| 60 || June 14 || Brewers
|-  style="text-align:center;
| 61 || June 15 || Brewers
|-  style="text-align:center;
| 62 || June 16 || @ Yankees
|-  style="text-align:center;
| 63 || June 17 || @ Yankees
|-  style="text-align:center;
| 64 || June 18 || @ Yankees
|-  style="text-align:center;
| 65 || June 20 || Orioles
|-  style="text-align:center;
| 66 || June 21 || Orioles
|-  style="text-align:center;
| 67 || June 22 || Orioles
|-  style="text-align:center;
| 68 || June 23 || Yankees
|-  style="text-align:center;
| 69 || June 24 || Yankees
|-  style="text-align:center;
| 70 || June 25 || Yankees
|-  style="text-align:center;
| 71 || June 27 || @ Orioles
|-  style="text-align:center;
| 72 || June 28 || @ Orioles
|-  style="text-align:center;
| 73 || June 29 || @ Orioles
|-  style="text-align:center;
| 74 || June 30 || Blue Jays
|-

|-  style="text-align:center;
| 75 || July 1 || Blue Jays
|-  style="text-align:center;
| 76 || July 2 || Blue Jays
|-  style="text-align:center;
| 77 || July 3 || Blue Jays
|-  style="text-align:center;
| 78 || July 4 || Mariners
|-  style="text-align:center;
| 79 || July 5 || Mariners
|-  style="text-align:center;
| 80 || July 6 || Mariners
|-  style="text-align:center;
| 81 || July 7 || Athletics
|-  style="text-align:center;
| 82 || July 8 || Athletics
|-  style="text-align:center;
| 83 || July 9 || Athletics
|-  style="text-align:center;
| 84 || July 10 || Angels
|-  style="text-align:center;
| 85 || July 11 || Angels
|-  style="text-align:center;
| 86 || July 12 || Angels
|-  style="text-align:center;
| 87 || July 13 || Angels
|-  style="text-align:center;
| 88 || July 17 || @ Mariners
|-  style="text-align:center;
| 89 || July 18 || @ Mariners
|-  style="text-align:center;
| 90 || July 19 || @ Mariners
|-  style="text-align:center;
| 91 || July 20 || @ Mariners
|-  style="text-align:center;
| 92 || July 21 || @ Athletics
|-  style="text-align:center;
| 93 || July 22 || @ Athletics
|-  style="text-align:center;
| 94 || July 23 || @ Athletics
|-  style="text-align:center;
| 95 || July 25 || @ Angels
|-  style="text-align:center;
| 96 || July 26 || @ Angels
|-  style="text-align:center;
| 97 || July 27 || @ Angels
|-  style="text-align:center;
| 98 || July 28 || @ White Sox
|-  style="text-align:center;
| 99 || July 29 || @ White Sox
|-  style="text-align:center;
| 100 || July 30 || @ White Sox
|-

|-  style="text-align:center;
| 101 || August 1 || Royals
|-  style="text-align:center;
| 102 || August 2 || Royals
|-  style="text-align:center;
| 103 || August 3 || Royals
|-  style="text-align:center;
| 104 || August 4 || White Sox
|-  style="text-align:center;
| 105 || August 5 || White Sox
|-  style="text-align:center;
| 106 || August 6 || White Sox
|-  style="text-align:center;
| 107 || August 8 || @ Tigers
|-  style="text-align:center;
| 108 || August 9 || @ Tigers
|-  style="text-align:center;
| 109 || August 10 || @ Tigers
|-  style="text-align:center;
| 110 || August 11 || @ Tigers
|-  style="text-align:center;
| 111 || August 12 || @ Royals
|-  style="text-align:center;
| 112 || August 12 || @ Royals
|-  style="text-align:center;
| 113 || August 13 || @ Royals
|-  style="text-align:center;
| 114 || August 14 || @ Royals
|-  style="text-align:center;
| 115 || August 15 || Tigers
|-  style="text-align:center;
| 116 || August 16 || Tigers
|-  style="text-align:center;
| 117 || August 17 || Tigers
|-  style="text-align:center;
| 118 || August 18 || @ Twins
|-  style="text-align:center;
| 119 || August 19 || @ Twins
|-  style="text-align:center;
| 120 || August 20 || @ Twins
|-  style="text-align:center;
| 121 || August 21 || @ Indians
|-  style="text-align:center;
| 122 || August 22 || @ Indians
|-  style="text-align:center;
| 123 || August 23 || @ Indians
|-  style="text-align:center;
| 124 || August 24 || @ Indians
|-  style="text-align:center;
| 125 || August 25 || @ Rangers
|-  style="text-align:center;
| 126 || August 26 || @ Rangers
|-  style="text-align:center;
| 127 || August 27 || @ Rangers
|-  style="text-align:center;
| 128 || August 29 || Indians
|-  style="text-align:center;
| 129 || August 30 || Indians
|-  style="text-align:center;
| 130 || August 31 || Indians
|-

|-  style="text-align:center;
| 131 || September 1 || Rangers
|-  style="text-align:center;
| 132 || September 2 || Rangers
|-  style="text-align:center;
| 133 || September 3 || Rangers
|-  style="text-align:center;
| 134 || September 5 || Twins
| 135 || September 6 || Twins
|-  style="text-align:center;
| 136 || September 7 || Twins
|-  style="text-align:center;
| 137 || September 8 || @ Orioles
|-  style="text-align:center;
| 138 || September 9 || @ Orioles
|-  style="text-align:center;
| 139 || September 10 || @ Orioles
|-  style="text-align:center;
| 140 || September 11 || @ Orioles
|-  style="text-align:center;
| 141 || September 12 || @ Yankees
|-  style="text-align:center;
| 142 || September 13 || @ Yankees
|-  style="text-align:center;
| 143 || September 14 || @ Yankees
|-  style="text-align:center;
| 144 || September 16 || Brewers
|-  style="text-align:center;
| 145 || September 16 || Brewers
|-  style="text-align:center;
| 146 || September 17 || Brewers
|-  style="text-align:center;
| 147 || September 18 || Brewers
|-  style="text-align:center;
| 148 || September 19 || @ Blue Jays
|-  style="text-align:center;
| 149 || September 20 || @ Blue Jays
|-  style="text-align:center;
| 150 || September 21 || @ Blue Jays
|-  style="text-align:center;
| 151 || September 23 || @ Brewers
|-  style="text-align:center;
| 152 || September 26 || Blue Jays
|-  style="text-align:center;
| 153 || September 27 || Blue Jays
|-  style="text-align:center;
| 154 || September 28 || Blue Jays
|-  style="text-align:center;
| 155 || September 29 || Orioles
|-  style="text-align:center;
| 156 || September 30 || Orioles
|-

|-  style="text-align:center;
| 157 || October 1 || Orioles
|-  style="text-align:center;
| 158 || October 2 || Yankees
|-  style="text-align:center;
| 159 || October 4 || Yankees
|-  style="text-align:center;
| 160 || October 4 || Yankees
|-  style="text-align:center;
| 161 || October 5 || Yankees
|-

Player stats

Batting

Starters by position
Note: Pos = Position; G = Games played; AB = At bats; H = Hits; Avg. = Batting average; HR = Home runs; RBI = Runs batted in

Other batters 
Note: G = Games played; AB = At bats; H = Hits; Avg. = Batting average; HR = Home runs; RBI = Runs batted in

Pitching

Starting pitchers 
Note: G = Games pitched; IP = Innings pitched; W = Wins; L = Losses; ERA = Earned run average; SO = Strikeouts

Other pitchers
Note: G = Games pitched; IP = Innings pitched; W = Wins; L = Losses; ERA = Earned run average; SO = Strikeouts

Relief pitchers
Note: G = Games pitched; W = Wins; L = Losses; SV = Saves; ERA = Earned run average; SO = Strikeouts

Postseason

ALCS

World Series

Game log

|-  style="text-align:center;
| 1 || October 7 || Angels
|-  style="text-align:center;
| 2 || October 8 || Angels
|-  style="text-align:center;
| 3 || October 10 || @ Angels
|-  style="text-align:center;
| 4 || October 11 || @ Angels
|-  style="text-align:center;
| 5 || October 12 || @ Angels
|-  style="text-align:center;
| 6 || October 14 || Angels
|-  style="text-align:center;
| 7 || October 15 || Angels
|-

|-  style="text-align:center;
| 1 || October 18 || @ Mets
|-  style="text-align:center;
| 2 || October 19 || @ Mets
|-  style="text-align:center;
| 3 || October 21 || Mets
|-  style="text-align:center;
| 4 || October 22 || Mets
|-  style="text-align:center;
| 5 || October 23 || Mets
|-  style="text-align:center;
| 6 || October 25 || @ Mets
|-  style="text-align:center;
| 7 || October 27 || @ Mets
|-

Awards and honors
Awards
Marty Barrett, ALCS MVP
Don Baylor, Silver Slugger Award (DH)
Wade Boggs, Silver Slugger Award (3B), AL Player of the Month (May)
Roger Clemens, American League Cy Young Award, American League Most Valuable Player, AL Pitcher of the Month (June)
Bruce Hurst, AL Pitcher of the Month (September)

Accomplishments
Wade Boggs, American League Batting Champion, .357
Wade Boggs, American League Leader, Walks (105)
Wade Boggs, Major League Baseball Leader, On-base percentage (.453)
Roger Clemens, American League Leader, ERA (2.48)
Roger Clemens, American League Leader, Wins (24)

All-Star Game
Wade Boggs, third base, starter
Roger Clemens, pitcher, starter
Rich Gedman, catcher, reserve
Jim Rice, outfield, reserve

Farm system

Source:

References

External links
1986 Boston Red Sox team page at Baseball Reference
1986 Boston Red Sox season at baseball-almanac.com
1986 ALCS Official Souvenir Program

Boston Red Sox
Boston Red Sox seasons
American League East champion seasons
American League champion seasons
Boston Red Sox
Red Sox